Bajabaj (also Romanized as Bājābāj; also known as Badzhabash, Bājābāsh, Bājeh Bāj, and Bājeh Yāj) is a village in Mavazekhan-e Shomali Rural District, Khvajeh District, Heris County, East Azerbaijan Province, Iran. At the 2006 census, its population was 342, in 67 families.

References 

Populated places in Heris County